Jo Ann Cram Joselyn is an astrogeophysicist. She was the first woman to receive a doctorate from the University of Colorado's astrogeophysics program, and has advocated for the importance of women's leadership in the sciences.

Education 
Joselyn received her Ph.D. from the University of Colorado Boulder in Boulder, Colorado, US in 1978, M.S. from the University of Colorado, Boulder, 1967, Engineering, and B.S. from the University of Colorado, Boulder, 1965, Applied Mathematics.

Career 
From 1968 to 1999, she worked at the National Oceanic and Atmospheric Administration (NOAA) as a space scientist and space weather forecaster. Her work focused on documenting and predicting space weather, particularly solar flares, sunspots, and their impact on communications. Joselyn served as the Secretary General of the International Association of Geomagnetism and Aeronomy (IAGA) from 1997 to 1999, and as Secretary General of the International Union of Geodesy and Geophysics (IUGG) from 1999 to 2007. To date, she is the only woman who has held that role. She was inducted into the Colorado Women's Hall of Fame in 2002.

References 

Year of birth missing (living people)
Living people
University of Colorado Boulder alumni